Colinton Parish Church is a congregation of the Church of Scotland. The church building is located in Dell Road, Colinton, Edinburgh, Scotland next to the Water of Leith.

History
St Cuthbert's Church, originally called the parish of Hailes, was founded in 1095 by Ethelred, Earl of Fife, son of King Malcolm III. The church came under the authority of Dunfermline Abbey and in 1234 this was confirmed in a Papal Bull from Pope Gregory.

In 1248 a rebuilt church was dedicated by David De Bernham but is thought to have been destroyed during the English invasion of 1544. The present church site has existed since 1636 and was rebuilt in 1771 and 1907.

A church has stood on the site for approximately 1000 years, but the current building was constructed and opened in 1908. Later, a new adjacent church hall was added in the 1990s.

The current church was redesigned in 1907-8 by the architect Sydney Mitchell. The church incorporates the tower from the old church, which had been designed by David Bryce and built in 1837. The interior has a neo-Byzantine design, with pink sandstone columns.

In 2001 the congregation had a roll of 1175 members, making it one of the largest church congregations by membership in the Church of Scotland.

Ministers

Several former ministers have served as Moderator of the General Assembly of the Church of Scotland, most recently the Very Reverend Dr William Bryce Johnston (in 1980). The minister is currently the Rev. Rolf Billes. The previous minister was the Reverend Dr George Whyte, who demitted the charge (resigned) in September 2008 to become Clerk to the Church of Scotland's Presbytery of Edinburgh.

 Peter Hewat MA from 1596 to 1598
 James Thomson MA (d.1635) from 1598 to 1634
 William Ogston MA, formerly regent of Marischal College from 1635 to 1639 
 Thomas Garvine from 1639 to 1649
 Alexander Livingston (d.1660) from 1650 to 1659
 Robert Bennet (d.1709) from 1659 to 1681
 Thomas Murray from 1682 to 1685
 Samuel Nimmo MA (d.1717) from 1686 to 1691
 James Thomson from 1694 to 1696 then translated to Elgin
 Thomas Paterson from 1697 to 1699 then translated to St Cuthbert's in Edinburgh
 Walter Allan MA (d.1732) from 1700 to 1732
 George Gibson (1706-1746) from 1733 to 1746
 John Hyndman from 1746 to 1752 when he translated to St Cuthbert's (Moderator in 1761)
 Rev Robert Fisher (1715-1782) from 1752 to 1782
 Rev Prof John Walker FRSE (1731-1803) from 1783 to 1803, Moderator in 1790
 John Fleming of Craigs (1750-1824) from 1804 to 1824
 Rev Lewis Balfour (1777-1860) from 1824 to 1860
 Rev William Lockhart DD (1825-1902) from 1861 to 1902, his will paid for the Lockhart Memorial Church in the Grange, Edinburgh
 Norman MacLean MA from 1902 to 1910
 Thomas Marjoribanks (1871-1947) from 1910 to 1947, chief of Clan Marjoribanks
 Very Rev William Bryce Johnston (1921-2005) from 1964 to 1991

Notable burials
Dr George William Balfour
Rev Lewis Balfour (1777-1860) minister of Colinton and Robert Louis Stevenson's grandfather
Edward Burton (engraver) and his great uncle Mungo Burton ARSA
Alexander Lorne Campbell architect
Rev Cpt Marcell William Townend Conran, author
John Gibson (chemist)
James Gillespie (philanthropist)
Admiral John Inglis
Very Rev William Bryce Johnston, Moderator of the Church of Scotland 1980-1
Sir Matthew Ochterlony, 4th baronet Ochterlony and architect, and his daughter, Gertrude Row-Fogo (d.1917 serving as a nurse)
Prof James Scott Robson (1921-2010)
Ramsay Heatley Traquair
Phoebe Traquair (1840-1912) artist

Colinton Cemetery

A cemetery was added in the late 19th century, to the south of the historic graveyard. This area contains the village war memorial. A relatively rare Norwegian war grave lies in the southern section towards the centre.

The war memorial standing in the centre of the small cemetery, was designed by Pilkington Jackson.

See also
List of Church of Scotland parishes

References

External links

Colinton Parish Church (official website)

Church of Scotland churches in Edinburgh
Category B listed buildings in Edinburgh
Listed churches in Edinburgh
Protestant churches converted from Roman Catholicism
Rebuilt churches in the United Kingdom
Churches completed in 1908
20th-century Church of Scotland church buildings